Xylophanes lamontagnei is a moth of the  family Sphingidae. It is known from Venezuela, Ecuador and Peru.

References

lamontagnei
Moths described in 2007